The 2008–09 A1 Grand Prix of Nations, Malaysia was an A1 Grand Prix race held at Sepang International Circuit, Sepang, Malaysia.

Pre-race
Because Great Britain, India and Mexico had only joined the season at the Chinese round, they were permitted to take part in a special practice session on November 20. In the wet conditions, Narain Karthikeyan was the fastest driver just in front of Danny Watts. Davíd Garza Pérez was the slowest with 3 seconds.

Drivers

Qualifying 
The qualifying sessions were the first to utilise the new "joker" Qualifying lap rule – where the driver has PowerBoost available for use over an entire qualifying lap, to be used in any session at the team's discretion.

(1) : Australia received a two-place grid penalty for the Sprint race for using a non-approved part in practice.

Sprint Race 
Following a major crash at the first start, involving  USA,  Brazil and  India, and the pack slowed down after it seemed to have accelerated off, the race was delayed 30 minutes for track cleanup, and reduced to 11 laps.

This Sprint Race was the first this season to utilise the new Sprint Race pit-stop rule, the windows always set for Laps 4–8.

Race red-flagged after the start because of accident.

Feature Race 
The second pit stop window was set for Laps 20–28.  Switzerland were sent to the back of the grid for having a brake cooler in too long before the start, and a pit crew violation during the Sprint Race pit-stop.

Notes 
 It was the 35th race weekend (70 starts).
 It was the 4th race in Malaysia, and the 4th at Sepang International Circuit.
 It was the first race weekend as rookie driver for  Stefano Coletti,  J. R. Hildebrand,  Armando Parente and  Ashley Walsh.
Records
 Switzerland scored their 9th pole position as Neel Jani.
 Neel Jani scored their 7th fastest lap.

References

External links
Switzerland's Sepang Sprint
Sprint race: as it happened
Sprint race results
Feature Glory for Ireland
Feature race results

A1 Grand Prix Of Nations, Malaysia, 2008-09
A1 Grand Prix
Motorsport competitions in Malaysia